Yuriy Goltsev (born 19 September 1995) is a Belarusian former professional footballer.

References

External links

Profile at teams.by

1995 births
Living people
Belarusian footballers
Association football defenders
FC Belcard Grodno players
FC Neman Grodno players
FC Lida players